Cookin' Together' is an album by saxophonist Red Holloway with organist Brother Jack McDuff's Quartet recorded in 1964 and released on the Prestige label.

Reception

Allmusic awarded the album 4½ stars stating "The material is  Burt Bacharach's "Wives and Lovers," "This Can't Be Love," and five Holloway originals, which have more diversity than one might expect. An interesting aspect to the soulful and swinging set is that McDuff made his debut on piano for two songs".

Track listing 
All compositions by Red Holloway except where noted.
 "Wives and Lovers" (Burt Bacharach, Hal David) - 8:07  
 "This Can't Be Love" (Lorenz Hart, Richard Rodgers) - 5:29
 "Something Funny" - 7:11
 "Brother Red" - 3:31
 "Denise" - 6:31
 "No Tears" - 8:02
 "Shout Brother" - 4:32

Personnel 
Red Holloway – tenor saxophone
Brother Jack McDuff – organ, piano
George Benson – guitar
Wilfred Middlebrooks – bass
Joe Dukes – drums

References 

Red Holloway albums
Jack McDuff albums
1964 albums
Prestige Records albums